Rubus yellow net virus (RYNV) is a plant pathogenic virus of the family Caulimoviridae.

External links
ICTVdB - The Universal Virus Database: Rubus yellow net virus
Family Groups - The Baltimore Method

Caulimoviridae
Viral plant pathogens and diseases